Lloyd C. Bird High School is a public high school in Chesterfield, an unincorporated community in Chesterfield County, Virginia, United States. It is part of Chesterfield County Public Schools and is located at 10301 Courthouse Road. It is named for former Virginia state senator Lloyd C. Bird.

Accreditation
Lloyd C. Bird High School has consistently reached AYP according to the standards of No Child Left Behind each year since the inception of the program.

Athletics
The mascot is a Skyhawk and the sports teams play in the Dominion District and Region 5C. They were members of the Central Region before VHSL realignment. Bird won the last VHSL Division 6 State Championship in 2012 (before realignment) with a 14–0 record. They repeated as state champions in 2013 with a 15–0 record, this time in class 5A. The Skyhawks then claimed their third straight state title in 2014 (also in 5A) with a 13–2 record.  They are ranked 10th nationally (through 2013) by winning percentage of all the high schools in the United States with over 300 games played. They have also won 25 district championships in 44 years of play. The Skyhawks are 388-110-2 in 44 seasons (1978-2021).

Lloyd C. Bird has also been to the state playoffs in many other sports including baseball, boys and girls basketball and many others. The boys basketball team won the 5A state championship in 2017. In 2018, 2019, 2020, 2021 the boys won 5A indoor state track and field championship. In 2018, 2019, 2021, and 2022, the boys captured the 5A outdoor state track and field championship.

Notable alumni
Slash Coleman – storyteller and writer
Doug Chapman – former NFL running back
Jalen Elliott - NFL player
Vince Gilligan – writer, director and producer; creator of Breaking Bad and Better Call Saul
Tyrese Rice – Boston College All ACC First Team point guard; Maccabi Tel Aviv Euroleague champion
Kristopher (Chef Plum) Plummer – known for multiple appearances on the Food Network and host of the "all recipes" segment on the nationally syndicated show Better
Jason Snelling – former Atlanta Falcons running back (retired after the 2013 season)
Linzi Gray – Actress
Anthony Harris – current NFL Defensive Back for the Philadelphia Eagles
Meg Gill - President & Co-Founder of Golden Road Brewing

References

1978 establishments in Virginia
Chesterfield County Public Schools
Educational institutions established in 1978
Public high schools in Virginia